Sergey Nikanorovich Sirotkin (also transliterated Sergei; born April 14, 1952) is a member of the State Duma of Russia for the Liberal Democratic Party of Russia (LDPR).  He is a member of the State Duma's Committee on Economic Policy, Entrepreneurship and Tourism.  He was a member of the Communist Party of the Soviet Union, and joined the LDPR in 1991.  He graduated from the Krylov Command-Engineering Academy and had a military career. 

In 1996–2000, Sirotkin was a deputy of the Legislative Assembly of the Ivanovo Region of the 2nd convocation. On March 2, 2008 he was elected to the deputy of the Ivanovo Regional Duma of the fifth convocation.

On February 24, 2016, by a decree of the State Duma, Sirotkin was appointed a member of the Central Election Commission of the Russian Federation.

References 

1952 births
Living people
Liberal Democratic Party of Russia politicians
Fourth convocation members of the State Duma (Russian Federation)
Fifth convocation members of the State Duma (Russian Federation)
Sixth convocation members of the State Duma (Russian Federation)